Salangselva is a river in Troms og Finnmark county, Norway. The river originates from the lake Isvatnet, flows through the Salangsdalen valley, the waterfall Kistefoss and the lake Øvrevatnet, and empties into the Sagfjorden at the village of Sjøvegan.

References

Rivers of Troms og Finnmark
Salangen
Bardu
Rivers of Norway